Riverside is a small city in Walker County, Texas, United States. The population was 522 at the 2020 census. Two famous natives of Riverside are the singer-actress Jennifer Holliday (born 1960), who is best known for her creation of the role of Effie in the successful Tony-award-winning Broadway musical "Dreamgirls", and Eugene C. Barker, a Texas historian (born 1874), who was affiliated with the University of Texas at Austin from 1895, when he arrived as a student, until his death.

Geography

Riverside is located at  (30.847070, –95.398092).

According to the United States Census Bureau, the city has a total area of 2.1 square miles (5.3 km), of which, 1.9 square miles (4.9 km) of it is land and 0.2 square miles (0.4 km) of it (8.25%) is water.

Climate

The climate in this area is characterized by hot, humid summers and generally mild to cool winters.  According to the Köppen Climate Classification system, Riverside has a humid subtropical climate, abbreviated "Cfa" on climate maps.

Demographics

As of the 2020 United States census, there were 522 people, 228 households, and 108 families residing in the city.

As of the census of 2000, there were 425 people, 168 households, and 116 families residing in the city. The population density was 224.6 people per square mile (86.8/km). There were 269 housing units at an average density of 142.2/sq mi (55.0/km). The racial makeup of the city was 74.59% White, 20.71% African American, 0.24% Native American, 0.24% Asian, 3.29% from other races, and 0.94% from two or more races. Hispanic or Latino of any race were 7.76% of the population.

There were 168 households, out of which 25.0% had children under the age of 18 living with them, 50.0% were married couples living together, 16.7% had a female householder with no husband present, and 30.4% were non-families. 23.2% of all households were made up of individuals, and 11.3% had someone living alone who was 65 years of age or older. The average household size was 2.53 and the average family size was 3.00.

In the city, the population was spread out, with 25.4% under the age of 18, 8.0% from 18 to 24, 21.4% from 25 to 44, 29.2% from 45 to 64, and 16.0% who were 65 years of age or older. The median age was 39 years. For every 100 females, there were 93.2 males. For every 100 females age 18 and over, there were 91.0 males.

The median income for a household in the city was $24,750, and the median income for a family was $26,875. Males had a median income of $26,591 versus $24,375 for females. The per capita income for the city was $15,697. About 25.0% of families and 32.2% of the population were below the poverty line, including 50.4% of those under age 18 and 31.3% of those age 65 or over.

Education
The City of Riverside is served by the Huntsville Independent School District. Riverside once had its own school  before merging with Huntsville in 1975. The old school building is now a church.

References

Cities in Walker County, Texas
Cities in Texas